Hampton is a provincial electoral district for the Legislative Assembly of New Brunswick, Canada.  It was first contested in the 2014 general election, having been created in the 2013 redistribution of electoral boundaries.

The district includes the Town of Hampton and a small part of the Town of Quispamsis, from which it runs southwesterly to Mispec, including parts of the City of Saint John south of the Mispec River and rural and suburban communities in between.  It drew significant population the former districts of Hampton-Kings, Saint John-Fundy, Saint John East and Quispamsis as well as a small part of Rothesay.

Members of the Legislative Assembly

Election results

References

External links 
Website of the Legislative Assembly of New Brunswick
Map of riding as of 2018

New Brunswick provincial electoral districts
Hampton, New Brunswick
Politics of Saint John, New Brunswick